Skyler  Augustus Gisondo (born July 22, 1996) is an American actor. He is known for his roles in the films Licorice Pizza, Booksmart, and Vacation, as well as the television programs The Righteous Gemstones and Santa Clarita Diet.

Early life and education
Gisondo was born on July 22, 1996, in Palm Beach County, Florida. His parents, Stacey (née Berke) and Ron, are ocean engineers. His last name comes from his paternal grandfather, who was Italian-American. His other three grandparents were Jewish.  After he began working frequently, he was homeschooled for several years. He spent a number of years in high school involved in the Jewish organization USY, including going to Israel on a program offered by them. He attended Milken Community High School in Los Angeles, graduating in 2014.

Gisondo grew up in Florida, and later moved to South Bay, Los Angeles.

In 2015, he began attending the University of Southern California's film school, at first full-time and later, part-time before taking a hiatus to film Santa Clarita Diet. He has stated that he plans to finish his college education.

Career
Gisondo began acting on television at the age of six. In Southern California, his mother sent photos of him to talent agencies. This led to a successful audition for a national Pizza Hut commercial. Gisondo later appeared in other commercials, television series and movies.

Personal life
Skyler has been in a relationship with Ari Haagen since July 2018. He is a resident of Manhattan Beach.

While filming Night at the Museum: Secret of the Tomb in Vancouver,  Gisondo asked Ben Stiller and Robin Williams to help him film a "promposal" formally asking his girlfriend to senior prom. They filmed a three-minute comedy routine with Crystal the Monkey.

Filmography

Film

Television

Video games

References

External links
 

1996 births
Living people
21st-century American male actors
American Ashkenazi Jews
American male child actors
American male film actors
American male television actors
American male voice actors
American people of Italian descent
Jewish American male actors
Male actors from Florida
People from Palm Beach County, Florida
21st-century American Jews